Buckhorn Lake is a private lake in Harris County in the state of Texas, United States. The lake is approximately  filled with cypress trees and was created by an underwater creek and spring.

It is well stocked for fishing.

References

Reservoirs in Texas
Geography of Houston
Protected areas of Harris County, Texas
Bodies of water of Harris County, Texas